Rhodafra is a genus of moths in the family Sphingidae.

Species
Rhodafra marshalli Rothschild & Jordan1903
Rhodafra opheltes (Cramer, 1780)

Macroglossini
Moth genera
Taxa named by Walter Rothschild
Taxa named by Karl Jordan